Julis was a Palestinian Arab village in the Gaza Subdistrict, located  northeast of Gaza on a slight elevation along the southern coastal plain. In 1945, there were 1,030 inhabitants in the village. It was depopulated during the 1948 Arab-Israeli War.

History
 
Julis was built on an archaeological site whose ancient name is unknown. 
Potsherds from the  Mamluk era have been found in the village.
The village had a Maqam (shrine) which was constructed with ancient materials.

Ottoman Empire
Julis was incorporated into the Ottoman Empire in 1517 with the rest of Palestine, and by 1596 it was  part of the nahiya  of Gaza, in  the Liwa of Gaza. It  consisted of 204 persons (37 households), all Muslims. They paid a fixed tax-rate of 33,3 % on agricultural products, including wheat, barley, fruit, beehives, vineyards and goats; a total of 10,400 akçe. 6,5/24 of the revenue went to a Waqf.

In 1838, Julis was noted as a village in the  District of Gaza.

In 1863 Victor Guérin found the village to be located on a hillock and containing  five hundred inhabitants. It had a oualy, dedicated to Scheik Mohammed,  was internally decorated with two  fragments. Guérin further noted that "Several marble columns are laid across the mouth of the well, with furniture arranged around it." 

An Ottoman village list of about 1870 indicated 101 houses and a population of 307, though  the population count included only men.

In 1882,  the PEF's Survey of Western Palestine described Julis as mostly built of adobe brick structures, and it had a well to the south, and a pool surrounded by gardens to the northeast.

British Mandate 
In the 1922 census of Palestine, conducted by the  British Mandate authorities,  Jules had a population of 481 Muslims, increasing in the 1931 census  to 682, still all Muslims, in  165 houses.

The village was laid out in a square, sandwiched between the two highways and bounded at one end by the traffic circle where they intersected. Its adobe and cement houses were constructed close together. The village had a mosque, and a shrine dedicated to Shaykh Khayr. According to local tradition, Khayr was a Muslim soldier killed fighting against the Crusaders. Village shops were scattered along the highway and in 1937 a school was opened; it had an enrollment of 86 students in the mid-1940s. Underground water was abundant in Julis and was used for domestic methods.

During World War II, the British authorities built a highway that passed through Julis parallel and feeding traffic to the coastal highway. The road also intersected at the village with the highway leading from al-Majdal (Ashkelon) to the Jerusalem–Jaffa highway. This gave the village importance as a transportation center. The British also constructed a military camp in Julis to control the junction.

In   the 1945 statistics Julis  had a population of 1,030  Muslims,  with a total of 13,584  dunams of land, according to an official land and population survey.  Of this, 1,360 dunams were used  for citrus and bananas, 931 for plantations and irrigable land, 10,803  for cereals, while 30 dunams were built-up land.

State of Israel 
On May 27–28, 1948, the Givati Brigade's First Battalion captured a military barracks in Julis during Operation Barak, but failed to gain control of the village itself. Egyptian forces attempted to recapture it almost immediately. According to the History of the Haganah, "The defenders of the place [Givati forces] blocked enemy units which tried... to infiltrate the barracks from the direction of the village of Julis." The Haganah account says that Julis was captured on June 11, as the Givati's Third Battalion mounted a number of operations to occupy a number of villages before the first truce of the war took place. However, in Gamal Abdel Nasser's memoirs, he recalled the maneuvers having taken place soon after the truce came into effect.

At the end of the truce, Julis became one of the many main positions the Egyptians failed to recapture. The Egyptian Army's Sixth Battalion which Nasser was chief of staff of, was ordered to take back the position. In later years, Nasser was very critical of the operation's planning, writing "Once again we were a facing a battle for which we had no preparation. We had no information about the enemy at Julis." In the few hours before his unit was to move towards Julis, Nasser organized a quick reconnaissance of the position. During the course of the battle, his commanding officer ordered him to participate in the actual fighting, leaving his unit without direction or coordination. After getting hold of a few aerial photographs of the village, Nasser convinced his commander that "even if we had succeeded in entering Julis... it would have turned into a cemetery for our forces." He argued that Julis was indefensible without the barracks which overlooked it. On July 10, after many Egyptian casualties, the battle was called off. According to the Haganah, the Givati units repulsed an Egyptian attack in which no Israeli soldier was injured. A close colleague of Nasser, Isma'il Mohieddin was killed during the battle.

Following the war the area was incorporated into the State of Israel and the moshav of Hodaya was established on village lands southwest of the village site in 1949. According to Palestinian historian Walid Khalidi, "Only a few houses remain. Most of them are made of cement, and have simple architectural features: flat roofs and rectangular doors and windows. One has two storeys and another has an 'illiyya. (A guest room on the top floor.)  One house, in the southwestern section of the site, is occupied by Jewish residents."

References

Bibliography

  
 
 

 
 

 

Nasser, G.A. (1955/1973):  "Memoirs" in Journal of Palestine Studies 
“Memoirs of the First Palestine War” in 2, no. 2 (Win. 73): 3-32, pdf-file, downloadable

External links
Welcome to Julis
 Julis, Zochrot
Survey of Western Palestine, Map 16:   IAA, Wikimedia commons
Julis from the Khalil Sakakini Cultural Center

Arab villages depopulated during the 1948 Arab–Israeli War
District of Gaza